Perineal pouch may refer to:

 Deep perineal pouch
 Superficial perineal pouch